Gluta velutina is a plant of tropical Asia in the cashew and sumac family Anacardiaceae. The specific epithet  is from the Latin meaning "velvety", referring to the inflorescences.

Description

Its smooth bark is brownish. The flowers are white. The wood can cause dermatitis and the fruit and leaves are poisonous.

Distribution and habitat
Gluta velutina grows naturally in Burma, Thailand, Vietnam, Sumatra, Peninsular Malaysia, Borneo and Java. Its habitat is tidal rivers and it is often found with the species Barringtonia conoidea and Pandanus helicopus.

References

velutina
Flora of Indo-China
Flora of Malesia
Plants described in 1850